Terminal Cool is an anthology album from alternative rock group, The Stems, released in Australia on 26 June 2005 and in the United States on 6 December that year. It is a collection of the band's recordings between 1983 and 1985. It includes four tracks: "Terminal Cool", "Sad Girl" (a demo version) and "Spaceship", which were not included on a previous compilation album, Mushroom Soup: The Citadel Years (March 2003), although it omits "Power of Love".

Track listing

 "She's a Monster" 3:46 
 "Make You Mine" 4:44 
 "Tears Me in Two" 3:20 
 "No Heart" 3:16 
 "Can't Resist" 2:34 
 "Love Will Grow" 3:14 
 "Under Your Mushroom" 2:36 
 "Just Ain't Enough" 2:45 
 "Jumping to Conclusions" 4:12 
 "On & On" 4:08 
 "For Always" (Alternate Demo Mix) 2:59 
 "Terminal Cool" 3:53 
 "Don't Let Me" 2:18 
 "All You Want Me For" 2:17 
 "Mr. Misery" (Demo version) 3:19 
 "Sad Girl" (Previously unreleased version) 3:06 
 "She's Fine" 2:29 
 "Can't Forget That Girl" (Demo version) 3:18 
 "Lon Chaney Junior's Daughter" 2:46 
 "Spaceship" 4:02 
 "Let Your Head Rest" 4:01

Links/Reviews
Terminal Cool review

The Stems albums
2005 compilation albums